Funky is an album by saxophonist Gene Ammons recorded in 1957 and released on the Prestige label.

Reception
AllMusic reviewer Scott Yanow stated: "The Gene Ammons all-star jam session recordings of the 1950s are all quite enjoyable and this one is no exception... Ammons seems to really inspire his sidemen on these soulful bop jams".

Track listing 
 "Funky" (Kenny Burrell) - 9:01    
 "Pint Size" (Jimmy Mundy) - 12:23    
 "Stella by Starlight" (Ned Washington, Victor Young) - 8:57    
 "King Size" (Mundy) - 9:16

Personnel 
Gene Ammons - tenor saxophone
Art Farmer - trumpet
Jackie McLean - alto saxophone
Mal Waldron - piano
Kenny Burrell - guitar
Doug Watkins - bass
Art Taylor - drums

References 

Gene Ammons albums
1957 albums
Prestige Records albums
Albums produced by Bob Weinstock
Albums recorded at Van Gelder Studio